Osbornite is a naturally occurring variety of titanium nitride which has been found in meteorites and was first discovered in the Bustee meteorite in the late nineteenth century.  Its crystals are golden-yellow octahedrons, combined with oldhamite.  It is friable and does not dissolve in acids.

References

Meteorite minerals